Just Add Magic is an American live-action family television series, loosely based on the 2010 book of the same name by Cindy Callaghan. It was produced by Amazon Studios. A pilot was produced in 2015 and the series commissioned for a full season the following year. Amazon renewed the series for a second season in June 2016 after it "set a record as the most successful Amazon Original Kids premiere weekend in terms of U.S. Prime Video streams and hours."

A followup series, Just Add Magic: Mystery City, was released on January 17, 2020.

Plot

Season 1

In the town of Saffron Falls, teenage girls Kelly, Darbie, and Hannah are best friends who love baking. They unearth an ancient mysterious cookbook involving magic. The girls visit Mama P's shop to buy magical ingredients, such as "Cedronian vanilla" and "Taurian thyme". The girls use magic at school, and soon realize that they are the protectors of the magical cookbook like many before them, such as Mama P, Ms. Silvers (Neighbor), and Grandma Becky. Kelly has one main goal: to find a magical recipe that will fix her grandmother's curse, Mama P’s curse does not let her leave Saffron Falls, and Ms. Silvers curse does not let her play the piano in public . To bring back her grandma to normal , Kelly collaborates with MamaP. MamaP who is trying to get rid of her curse , pretends to be helping Kelly , who indeed trying to break her own curse. But Hannah does not support her and tries to stop them. Finally MamaP breaks her curse and puts whole town in a curse. To break the curse the trio makes a cake. It breaks the curse and also brings back Chuck ,whom the OC's cursed unintentionally. .

Season 2

Part 1 
After breaking every curse, they realised that they had brought back Chuck Hankins, a teenage boy from the ’60s who had suddenly disappeared because of The OC's (Original Cooks): were all once the protectors of the cookbook.  Chuck casts an invisibility spell but, the girls are able to see and enter the invisible trailer. There they discover that Chuck has another cookbook that is copying recipes from their cookbook, so they steal it. Later the original cooks put a spell on Chuck, and he retaliates with spells of his own. Eventually, they break Chuck's Immortality Spell, also breaking Rose's and frees her from the book. Chuck and Rose go back in time and live out their lives.

Part 2 
The book and spices are stolen from Kelly's backpack. Kelly, Hannah, and Darbie meet a previous protector from the '90s named RJ. With Jake's help, they are able to get the book back. The girls become suspicious of Mr.Morris, Hannah's teacher at Fox Canyon for erasing everyone's memories of magic but it wasn't him, it was Caroline, a former protector of the cookbook, who was also disguised as Jill, Mrs. Quinn's campaign manager. The trio take precautionary measures to stop Caroline from casting spells on them and destroying their spices. despite the consequences Cedronian vanilla could bring them.

Season 3

Part 1 
Mama P's has been bought by a coffee chain called Springtown Coffee. Kelly, Hannah, and Darbie become suspicious of the manager Erin Chua. They soon notice clues of someone who knows that magic is real, even after all memories of magic have been erased. This, someone, steals their newly harvested Night Blooming spices, and is therefore dubbed the "Night Bandit." The girls meet Darbie's friend, Piper, and they introduce her to magic. The four of them work together to find the Night Bandit. It turns out that Kelly is actually the Night Bandit and she was poisoned by the spell that brought back the garden in the previous season, Come Back Kombucha Tea. In the final episode, the spell on her is broken, but the girls needed to save Grandma Becky after she disappears. They go forward in time and save her, thus also creating a new spice named "Parquinnien" which is a blend of their last names (Hannah Parker-Kent, Kelly Quinn, Darbie O’Brien). The cookbook moves on to Zoe, Erin's daughter and one of the new protectors.

Part 2 
The cookbook has moved on to the new protectors: Zoe (Erin's daughter), Ish (Zoe's neighbor) and Leo (Zoe's stepbrother). With the help of Kelly, Darbie, and Hannah, the new trio are convinced that magic exists and able to go through troubling times together.

Just Add Magic: Mystery City (2020) 

In the spinoff series, new protectors Zoe, Ish, and Leo are set to solve their first mystery. Zoe, wanting to learn more about her father who had died when she was two years old, uncovers a book at the library that had been associated with him. The book tells a story from the late 1800s, narrated from the point of view of Ian Maddox, who was then a protector along with brothers Clint and Folsom Wesson. The Wesson brothers grew power-hungry and created a magical sourdough starter that would help them get large quantities of gold, but the downside of the spell was that it caused mass destruction. With Charles Peizer's assistance, Ian Maddox traveled to the future to hide the starter from the Wesson brothers. Zoe, Ish, and Leo find themselves in a race against the Wessons' descendants to find the sourdough starter. Their goal is to find three coins that will help them discover where the starter is and then destroy it once and for all—if the Wessons don't get to it first. Towards the end, with the help of Kelly, Darbie, and Hannah, the trio is successful in saving the world by using the sourdough starter to distribute the magic from the book throughout the globe.

Cast and characters

Main 
 Olivia Sanabia as Kelly Quinn: New protector of the Cookbook. Of the new trio, she is the first to discover the power of the Cookbook. She enjoys playing basketball. She is very loyal and takes her role in magic very seriously.
 Abby Donnelly as Darbie O'Brien: New protector of the Cookbook. She is known for being clumsy and fun. Darbie plays basketball and participates in theater and is also interested in super heroes.
  Aubrey Miller as Hannah Parker-Kent: New protector of the Cookbook. She is very smart and begins attending a different and more selective school in the second season. Hannah enjoys playing piano and takes lessons from Ms Silvers. She is also concerned about being healthy.
 Judah Bellamy as Jake Williams III: Kelly, Hannah, and Darbie's friend who works at Mama P's Cafe and later has his own business selling food on his food bike. He often helps the girls cook and get supplies for their recipes and is very fun.
 Catia Ojeda as Terri Quinn: Kelly's mom who becomes town Mayor after defeating Adam Lever.
 Andrew Burlinson as Scott Quinn: Kelly's dad and Becky's son. He is very concerned when his mother is ill and is often shown as a being playful with his children.
 Dee Wallace as Rebecca “Becky” Quinn: Kelly's grandma who was a protector when she was around Kelly's age. She used powerful magic to break her bond to the book. She is very caring and friendly. 
 Amy Hill as Ida "Mama P" Perez: Cafe owner and previous protector of the book. Due to a curse on her, she was unable to leave town for many years. She often acts selfishly but is good deep within.
 Ellen Karsten as Ms. Gina Silvers: Music teacher and previous protector of the book. Due to a curse on her, she was unable to play piano in public for years.
 Aiden Lovekamp as Buddy Quinn: Kelly's younger brother who enjoys playing sports and pestering his sister, but he still loves his big sister.

Recurring 
 Mira Furlan as The Traveler: The keeper of the cookbook who occasionally appears to give advice to the protectors
 Zach Callison as Chuck Hankins / Charles Piezer: Previous protector from the 1800s who made a great mistake involving magic and spent years trying to reverse it.
 Jeremy Guskin as RJ White: Previous protector from the 1990s who attempted to become rich and popular using magic
 Jolie Hoang-Rappaport as Zoe Chua: Erin's daughter who later becomes a protector of the cookbook. 
 Felisha Terrell as Nöelle Jasper: Previous protector from the 1990s who attempted to use magic to boost her restaurant business
 Sprague Grayden as Caroline Palmer (Jill): Previous protector from the 1990s who attempted to erase magic from the world.
 Tess Paras as Erin Chua: Springtown Coffee manager who takes over Mama P's Cafe for a time.
 Usman Ally as Arthur Morris: Hannah's teacher who helped the group of protectors from the 1990s with their recipes.
 Jen Drohan as Amy: Mr. O'Brien's girlfriend

Just Add Magic: Mystery City 

 Jolie Hoang-Rappaport as Zoe: Erin's daughter who later becomes a protector of the cookbook. Zoe also appears in Just Add Magic (Before  New Protectors , along with her mother Erin).
 Tyler Sanders as Leo: New protector of the cookbook and Zoe's stepbrother. Leo is Nick's son and Zoe's step-brother. Leo is very interested in superheroes and art.
 Jenna Qureshi as Ish/Ishita: New protector of the cookbook. She is Zoe and Leo's neighbor.
 Matt Dellapina as Nick Sellitti: Erin's new husband who owns his own restaurant
 Tess Paras as Erin Chua: Zoe's mother and a Springtown Coffee manager who takes over Mama P's Cafe for a time and later moves to Bay City to marry Nick.
 James Urbaniak as Pierce Hamilton: The villain of the story who is desperate to beat Zoe, Leo, and Ish in solving the mystery
 Casey Simpson as Cody Hamilton: Pierce's son who likes spending time with his family solving the mystery.
 Sydney Taylor as Lexi Hamilton: Pierce's daughter who is good friends with Ish.
 Shane Harper as Ian Maddox: Past protector revealed to be Zoe's father and Erin's late husband.

Episodes

Production and release 
On January 4, 2018, a trailer was released announcing more episodes, which premiered on Amazon on January 19, 2018, as an extension of the second season.

On January 11, 2019, a trailer was released announcing the third season, which premiered on February 1.

The series aired on Universal Kids from June 9, 2019, to November 22, 2019.

On September 20, 2019, an announcement was made that a Just Add Magic special would come out on October 25.

Reception
Angela Arsenault of Decider.com positively reviewed the first season of the series, calling it "A More Than Worthy Addition To The Teenage Witch Sub-Genre[.]" Jessica Jernigan also gave the second season a positive review, saying that "[d]arkness and danger is leavened with humor. And the supernatural elements are amplifications of real-life situations and experiences. By the season finale, it’s not just magic that saves the day—it’s also humanity." Giving the first season 4/5 stars, Emily Ashby of Common Sense Media noted that

References

External links 
 
 Just Add Magic on Amazon Video

2010s American children's television series
2010s American school television series
2015 American television series debuts
2019 American television series endings
Amazon Prime Video original programming
English-language television shows
Middle school television series
Television about magic
Television series about teenagers
Amazon Prime Video children's programming
Television series by Amazon Studios
Television shows set in California